Umbrella insurance refers to liability insurance that is in excess of specified other policies and also potentially primary insurance for losses not covered by the other policies.

When an insured person is liable to someone, the insured's primary insurance policies pay up to their limits, and any additional amount is paid by the umbrella policy (up to the limit of the umbrella policy).

It is a product available mainly in the United States.

Excess versus umbrella 
Excess insurance is similar in that it pays after an underlying primary policy is exhausted, but the critical difference is that excess policies are normally "follow form" policies that conform exactly to the coverage of the underlying policy, except that they add on their own excess limit which is then stacked on top of the primary policy's limit. Umbrella policies tend to provide broader coverage over one or more primary policies, in that they usually lack "follow form" clauses, their definitions of what is covered may be broader than the definitions in the primary policies, and they sometimes lack exclusions used in underlying primary policies.  Thus, an umbrella policy may cover certain risks from the first dollar of loss or liability incurred, which were never covered under the primary policies.  For those risks that are left uncovered by primary policies but are covered under the umbrella policy, the latter is said to "drop down" to cover them as primary insurance and fill in the gaps in the underlying policies. Hence, the "umbrella" nomenclature is a reference to the broader coverage of the policy.

Commercial 
A commercial umbrella policy may be based on a commercial general liability (CGL) primary policy.

Personal 
Personal umbrella policies are typically made excess of a person's homeowner's and automobile insurance. Coverage varies by the company, and detailed comparisons can be constructed showing the differences. Customers are generally high-net-worth individuals, and in the United States, a trade group called the Council for Insuring Private Clients was formed in 2012 to focus on this market. As of 1995, the largest personal insurer in the United States, State Farm Insurance, reportedly had 1.4 million personal umbrella policyholders in the United States, and in 2008 12% of its customers had umbrella coverage.

Causes of loss 
Most personal umbrella losses are related to auto accidents, with a 2013 analysis finding that 78% of claims and 87% of losses related to autos. In a prior 2000-2005 survey, most of the losses were not covered by the underlying policy ("drop-down"), while in 2013 most were in excess of the underlying.

Examples of liability that an umbrella policy may cover that a homeowner's policy often excludes include:

 False arrest
 Invasion of privacy
 Libel
 Slander

History 
Umbrella policies began to be sold in 1949, and became popular in the 1960s, and coverage details changed in various ways over the next several decades.

Citations

Liability insurance